Oscaecilia bassleri, also known as the Pastaza River caecilian, is a species of caecilian in the family Caeciliidae. It is known from the lower Amazonian slopes and western Amazon Basin in Ecuador and Peru, but its range might extend into Bolivia and Colombia. The specific name bassleri honors Harvey Bassler, an American geologist and paleontologist.

References

Oscaecilia
Amphibians of Ecuador
Amphibians of Peru
Taxa named by Emmett Reid Dunn
Amphibians described in 1942
Taxonomy articles created by Polbot